Tevaun Smith (born January 30, 1993) is a professional Canadian football wide receiver for the Ottawa Redblacks of the Canadian Football League (CFL). He played college football at Iowa. Smith has also been a member of the Indianapolis Colts, Oakland Raiders, Jacksonville Jaguars, and Edmonton Elks.

Early life and education
Smith attended Kent School (class of 2012) in Kent, Connecticut. Smith spend four seasons with the Iowa Hawkeyes playing in 47 games, catching 102 passes for 1,500 yards with seven touchdowns.

Professional career

Indianapolis Colts
Smith signed with the Indianapolis Colts as an undrafted free agent on May 2, 2016. He was released on September 3, 2016 and was signed to the practice squad the next day. He was elevated to the active roster on October 18, 2016. He was released by the Colts on November 8, 2016 and was signed to the practice squad the next day. He signed a reserve/future contract with the Colts on January 2, 2017.

On August 9, 2017, Smith was waived/injured by the Colts and placed on injured reserve. He was released on August 16, 2017.

Oakland Raiders
On November 29, 2017, Smith was signed to the Oakland Raiders' practice squad. He was released on December 6, 2017.

Jacksonville Jaguars
On December 26, 2017, Smith was signed to the Jacksonville Jaguars' practice squad. He signed a reserve/future contract with the Jaguars on January 22, 2018. On June 6, 2018, Smith was waived/injured by the Jaguars and was placed on injured reserve. He was released on September 7, 2018.

Edmonton Eskimos / Elks
On February 11, 2019, Smith signed a two-year contract with the Edmonton Eskimos. The Eskimos had previously drafted him with the 8th-overall pick in the first round of the 2016 CFL Draft. In his first season in the league he caught 55 passes for 632 yards with six touchdowns. He signed a contract extension through the 2021 season with Edmonton on December 31, 2020. During the 2021 season, Smith caught 27 passes for 324 yards. Smith was released by the Elks during training camp on May 17, 2022.

Ottawa Redblacks
On May 21, 2022, it was announced that Smith had signed with the Ottawa Redblacks. In his first year in Ottawa Smith played in eight games and caught 14 passes for 142 yards with two touchdowns. On February 2, 2023 Smith and the Redblacks agreed to a one-year contract extension.

References

External links
Ottawa Redblacks profile
Iowa Hawkeyes bio
NFL.com profile
Indianapolis Colts bio

1993 births
Living people
American football wide receivers
Canadian football wide receivers
Black Canadian players of American football
Players of Canadian football from Ontario
Canadian football people from Toronto
Iowa Hawkeyes football players
Indianapolis Colts players
Oakland Raiders players
Jacksonville Jaguars players
Edmonton Elks players
Ottawa Redblacks players
Kent School alumni